Franklin station may refer to:

 Franklin station (Calgary), a light rail station in Calgary, Alberta
 Franklin station (Sacramento), a light rail station in Sacramento, California
 Franklin metro station, a metro station in Santiago, Chile
 Franklin D. Roosevelt (Paris Métro), a metro station in Paris, France
 Franklin/Dean College station, a commuter rail station in Franklin, Massachusetts
 Franklin Park station, a commuter rail station in Franklin Park, Illinois
 Franklin Square (IRT Third Avenue Line), a demolished elevated station in New York City, New York
 Franklin Square station, an unused commuter rail station in Philadelphia, Pennsylvania
 Franklin Street (IRT Broadway–Seventh Avenue Line), a subway station in New York City, New York
 Franklin Street (IRT Sixth Avenue Line), a former elevated station in New York City, New York
 Franklin Street (IRT Ninth Avenue Line), a former elevated station in New York City, New York
 Franklin Street station (Pennsylvania), a bus station and former railroad station in Reading, Pennsylvania
 Belmont Avenue station, a commuter rail station in Franklin Park, Illinois, also known as Franklin Park-Belmont Avenue
 Ben Franklin Station, a proposed renaming of 30th Street Station in Philadelphia, Pennsylvania
 Chicago station (CTA Brown and Purple Lines), an elevated station in Chicago, Illinois, sometimes called Chicago/Franklin
 John W. Olver Transit Center, an regional transit hub in Franklin County, Massachusetts

See also 
 Franklin Avenue Station (disambiguation)